The Androscoggin Mill is a pulp and paper mill in Jay, Maine. At its peak, 1,500 workers were employed in the facility. In February 2023, management announced that the mill would permanently close in March 2023.

Early history
Construction began in 1963 and was completed in 1965. The mill replaced the Riley Mill, which was located less than a mile away. It was built by International Paper, which was the largest paper company in the world at the time. It was named for the nearby Androscoggin River.

1987-88 strike
 
In 1987–88, 1,200 mill workers and members of the United Paperworkers' International Union went on strike against the company, which was demanding wage reductions and other givebacks despite record profits. The mill eventually reopened with permanent replacements.

Sales and closure
In 2006 International Paper sold this plant to Verso Holdings, LLC and 1,000 people worked in the mill at that time. In 2015, Verso laid off 300 workers. A year later, it filed for bankruptcy. In 2017, it laid off an additional 300 people and idled a machine. In April 2020, a wood pulp digester exploded, destroying the mill's pulp machines. Pixelle Specialty Solutions, which had purchased the mill two months prior in February, decided not to rebuild. In September 2022, the company decided to permanently close the mill. In February 2023, Pixelle announced that the mill would cease production no later than March 9, 2023.

References

Industrial buildings completed in 1965
Industrial buildings and structures in Maine
Pulp and paper mills in the United States
Pulp and paper industry in Maine
Buildings and structures in Franklin County, Maine
Jay, Maine
1965 establishments in Maine